Zhaobao Mountain also known as Zhaobao Mount or Zhaobao Hill.

Description 
The Zhaobao Mount Scenic Area includes walking trails on and around the hill with numerous sites to explore during a visit. These include the  seven-story Aozhu Pagoda, the   Weiyuan City Wall built during the Ming Dynasty, and the even older Zhenhai Seawall originally built in 897 CE during the Tang Dynasty. Sanskrit rock carvings, including a Buddhist prayer chant, are one of the oldest features of the hill. The Tianhou Temple is dedicated to the Heavenly Empress (see also Mazu) and the Guanyin Pavilion is dedicated to the Goddess of Mercy (see also Guan Yin).
The mountain is named after the sea god Zhāobǎo Qīláng, a forerunner of the more recent sea deity Qianliyan, a subordinate of the goddess Mazu.

At the foot of the hill is the Zhenhai Coastal Defense Museum. Exhibits include the war against Japanese pirates during the Ming Dynasty, the Battle of Zhenhai in 1885 (see also Sino-French War), and the modern Chinese navy.

Transport 
The scenic area can be accessed by bus 541 from Ningbo city. The ride takes approximately 50 minutes.

Entry 
Standard tickets are 60 yuan per person.

History

The area was briefly occupied by British forces in 1842 and ended with ratification of the Treaty of Nanking.

External links 
Zhaobao Mount Scenery Zone
Ancient Coast Defense Works at Zhenhaikou
Zhenhai Coast Defence History Museum

Mountains of Zhejiang
Tourist attractions in Ningbo